There have been two baronetcies created for persons with the surname Boyd, one in the Baronetage of Great Britain and one in the Baronetage of the United Kingdom.

The Boyd Baronetcy, of Danson in the County of Kent, was created in the Baronetage of Great Britain on 2 June 1775 for John Boyd. He was a wealthy sugar merchant and Vice-Chairman of the British East India Company. Boyd constructed the mansion of Danson Hill near Bexleyheath. He was succeeded by his son, the second Baronet. He represented Wareham in the House of Commons from 1780 to 1784. In 1807 he had the Danson Hill estate sold. The title descended from father to son until the early death of his great-grandson, the fifth Baronet, in 1857. The late Baronet was succeeded by his uncle, the sixth Baronet. He was a clergyman. On his death in 1889 the baronetcy became extinct.

The Boyd Baronetcy, of Howth House in Howth in the County of Dublin, was created in the Baronetage of the United Kingdom on 29 June 1916 for the Irish judge Walter Boyd. He was a Judge of the High Court of Justice in Ireland, King's Bench Division, from 1897 to 1916 and a Judge of the Irish Admiralty Court from 1910 to 1916. His eldest son, the second Baronet, was a prominent lawyer, and in private life a noted boat designer, who created the Howth 17th Footer yacht. He died without surviving male issue in 1948 and was succeeded by his nephew, the third Baronet. He was the son of Dr Cecil Anderson Boyd, second son of the first Baronet.  He was succeeded in 2018 by his grandson, the fourth Baronet.

Boyd baronets, of Danson (1775)
Sir John Boyd, 1st Baronet (1718–1800)
Sir John Boyd, 2nd Baronet (1750–1815)
Sir John Boyd, 3rd Baronet (1786–1855)
Sir John Augustus Hugh Boyd, 4th Baronet (1819–1857)
Sir Harley Hugh Boyd, 5th Baronet (1853–1876)
Sir Frederick Boyd, 6th Baronet (1820–1889)

Boyd baronets, of Howth House (1916)

Sir Walter Boyd, 1st Baronet (1833–1918)
Sir Walter Herbert Boyd, 2nd Baronet (1867–1948)
Sir Alexander Walter Boyd, 3rd Baronet (1934–2018)
Sir Kyle Robert Rendell Boyd, 4th Baronet (born 1987)

Notes

References

Baronetcies in the Baronetage of the United Kingdom
Extinct baronetcies in the Baronetage of Great Britain